Silver's Serenade is an album by jazz pianist Horace Silver released on the Blue Note label in 1963 featuring performances by Silver with Blue Mitchell, Junior Cook, Gene Taylor, and Roy Brooks.

Reception
The Allmusic review awarded the album 4 stars.

Track listing
All compositions by Horace Silver
 "Silver's Serenade" - 9:21
 "Let's Get to the Nitty Gritty" - 7:24
 "Sweet Sweetie Dee" - 7:34
 "The Dragon Lady" - 7:04
 "Nineteen Bars" - 6:21

Recorded on May 7 (1, 5) and 8 (2-4), 1963.

Personnel
Horace Silver - piano
Blue Mitchell - trumpet
Junior Cook - tenor saxophone
Gene Taylor - bass
Roy Brooks - drums

Production
 Alfred Lion - production
 Rudy Van Gelder - engineering
 Reid Miles - design
 Francis Wolff - photography

References

1963 albums
Albums produced by Alfred Lion
Albums recorded at Van Gelder Studio
Blue Note Records albums
Horace Silver albums